"Archaeoraptor" is the informal generic name for a fossil chimera from China in an article published in National Geographic magazine in 1999. The magazine claimed that the fossil was a "missing link" between birds and terrestrial theropod dinosaurs. Even before this publication, there had been severe doubts about the fossil's authenticity. A further scientific study showed it to be a forgery constructed from rearranged pieces of real fossils from different species. Zhou et al. found that the head and upper body belong to a specimen of the primitive fossil bird Yanornis. A 2002 study found that the tail belongs to a small winged dromaeosaur, Microraptor, named in 2000. The legs and feet belong to an as-yet-unknown-animal.

The scandal brought attention to illegal fossil deals conducted in China. Although "Archaeoraptor" was a forgery,  many true examples of feathered dinosaurs have been found and demonstrate the evolutionary connection between birds and other theropods.

Scandal
"Archaeoraptor" was unveiled at a press conference held by National Geographic magazine in October 1999. At the same press conference, plans were announced to return the fossil to Chinese authorities, as it was illegally exported. In November 1999 National Geographic featured the fossil in an article written by art editor Christopher Sloan. The article in general discussed feathered dinosaurs and the origin of birds. It claimed the fossil was "a missing link between terrestrial dinosaurs and birds that could fly" and informally referred to it as "Archaeoraptor liaoningensis", announcing it would later be formally named as such. This name means "ancient robber of Liaoning". This drew immediate criticism from Storrs L. Olson, Curator of Birds at the National Museum of Natural History in Washington, D.C. Writing in Backbone, the newsletter of his museum, he denounced the publication of a scientific name in a popular journal, without peer review, as a "nightmare".

On February 3, 2000, National Geographic issued a press release stating that the fossil could be a composite and that an internal investigation had begun. In that same month Bill Allen, National Geographic editor, told Nature that he was "furious" to learn that the fossil might have been faked. In the March issue, in the forum section, a letter from Dr. Xu Xing pointed out that the tail section probably did not match the upper body. In October 2000 National Geographic published the results of their investigation, in an article written by Pulitzer Prize-winning investigative journalist Lewis M. Simons. Simons concluded that the fossil was a composite and that virtually everyone involved in the project had made some mistakes.

Chronology

According to National Geographic'''s report, the story of "Archaeoraptor" begins in July 1997 in Xiasanjiazi, China, where farmers routinely dug in the shale pits with picks and sold fossils to dealers for a few dollars. This was an illegal practice, but it was common then. In this case, one farmer found a rare fossil of a toothed bird, complete with feather impressions. The fossil broke into pieces during collection. Nearby, in the same pit, he found pieces including a feathered tail and legs. He cemented several of these pieces together in a manner that he believed was correct. He knew that it would make a more complete-looking and, thus, more expensive fossil. It was sold in June 1998 to an anonymous dealer and smuggled to the United States. According to authorities in Beijing, no fossils may leave China legally.

By the fall 1998 annual meeting of the Society of Vertebrate Paleontology, held in Utah, United States, rumors were circulating about a striking fossil of a primitive bird that was in private hands. This fossil was presented by an anonymous dealer at a gem show in Tucson, Arizona. The Dinosaur Museum in Blanding, Utah, purchased it in February 1999. The museum was run by the late Stephen A. Czerkas (d. 2015) and his wife, Sylvia Czerkas. Mr. Czerkas did not hold a university degree, but he was a dinosaur enthusiast and artist. He arranged for patrons of his museum, including trustee Dale Slade, to provide $80,000 for the purchase of the fossil, to study it scientifically, and prevent it from disappearing into an anonymous private collection.

The Czerkases contacted paleontologist Phil Currie, who contacted the National Geographic Society. Currie agreed to study the fossil on condition that it was eventually returned to China. The National Geographic Society intended to get the fossil formally published in the peer-reviewed science journal Nature, and then follow up immediately with a press conference and an issue of National Geographic. Editor Bill Allen asked that all members of the project keep the fossil secret so that the magazine would have a scoop on the story.

Slade and the Czerkases intended the fossil to be the "crown jewel" of the Dinosaur Museum and planned to keep it on display there for five years. Sloan says that he flew to Utah in the spring of 1999 to convince Stephen Czerkas to return the fossil to China immediately after publication, or he would not write about it for National Geographic and Currie would not work on it. Czerkas then agreed. Currie then contacted the Institute of Vertebrate Paleontology and Paleoanthropology in Beijing, and National Geographic flew the IVPP's Xu Xing to Utah to be part of the "Archaeoraptor" team.

During the initial examination of the fossil on March 6, 1999, it had already become clear to Currie that the left and right feet mirrored each other perfectly and that the fossil had been completed by using both slab and counter slab. He also noticed no connection could be seen between the tail and the body. In July 1999, Currie and the Czerkases brought the fossil to the High-Resolution X-ray CT Facility of the University of Texas (Austin) founded and operated by Dr. Timothy Rowe to make CT scans. Rowe, having made the scans on July 29, determined that they indicated that the bottom fragments, showing the tail and the lower legs, were not part of the larger fossil. He informed the Czerkases on August 2 that there was a chance of the whole being a fraud. During a subsequent discussion, Rowe and Currie were pressured by the Czerkases to keep their reservations private.

Currie in the first week of September sent his preparator, Kevin Aulenback, to the Dinosaur Museum in Blanding to prepare the fossil for better study. Aulenback concluded that the fossil was "a composite specimen of at least 3 specimens...with a maximum...of five...separate specimens", but the Czerkases angrily denied this and Aulenbeck only reported this to Currie. Currie did not inform National Geographic of these problems.

On August 13, 1999, the team submitted a manuscript titled "A New Toothed Bird With a Dromaeosaur-like Tail" under the names of Stephen Czerkas, Currie, Rowe, and Xu, to the journal Nature in London. The paper mentions two places and includes a figure illustrating the point that one of the legs and the tail are counterparts that were composited into the main slab.

On August 20 Nature rejected the paper, indicating to the Czerkases that National Geographic had refused to delay publication, leaving too little time for peer review. The authors then submitted the paper to Science, which sent it out for peer review. Two reviewers informed Science that "the specimen was smuggled out of China and illegally purchased" and that the fossil had been "doctored" in China "to enhance its value." Science then rejected the paper. According to Sloan, the Czerkases did not inform National Geographic about the details of the two rejections.

By that time the November issue of National Geographic was already in preparation for printing, but "Archaeoraptor" was never formally published in any peer-reviewed journal.National Geographic went ahead and published without peer review. The fossil was unveiled in a press conference on October 15, 1999, and in November 1999 National Geographic contained an article by Christopher P. Sloan—a National Geographic art editor. Sloan described it as a missing link that helped elucidate the connection between dinosaurs and birds. The original fossil was put on display at the National Geographic Society in Washington, D.C., pending return to China. In the article Sloan used the name "Archaeoraptor liaoningensis" but with a disclaimer (so that it would not count as a nomenclatural act for scientific classification) in anticipation of Czerkas  being able to publish a peer-reviewed description at some point in the future.

After the November National Geographic came out, Storrs L. Olson, curator of birds in the National Museum of Natural History of the Smithsonian Institution published an open letter on 1 November 1999, pointing out that "the specimen in question is known to have been illegally exported" and protesting the "prevailing dogma that birds evolved from dinosaurs." Olson complained that Sloan, a journalist, had usurped the process of scientific nomenclature by publishing a name first in the popular press: "This is the worst nightmare of many zoologists—that their chance to name a new organism will be inadvertently scooped by some witless journalist."

In October 1999, after having been informed by Currie of the problems and seeing the specimen for the first time, Xu noticed that the tail of "Archaeoraptor" strongly resembled an unnamed maniraptoran dinosaur that he was studying—later to be named Microraptor zhaoianus. He returned to China and traveled to Liaoning Province where he inspected the fossil site and contacted several fossil dealers. He eventually found a fairly complete fossil of a tiny dromaeosaur, and the tail of this new fossil corresponded so exactly to the tail on the "Archaeoraptor" fossil that it had to be the counter slab— it even had two matching yellow oxide stains. On December 20, 1999, Xu Xing sent e-mails to the authors and Sloan, announcing that the fossil was a fake.

On February 3, 2000, The National Geographic News issued a press release stating that the "Archaeoraptor" fossil might be a composite and that an internal investigation had begun. In the March issue of National Geographic Xu's letter ran in the Forum section of the magazine, and Bill Allen had Xu change the word "fake" to "composite".

On April 4, 2000, Stephen Czerkas told a group of paleontologists in Washington that he and Sylvia had made "an idiot, bone-stupid mistake". Currie, Allen, and Sloan all expressed regret. Rowe felt vindicated, claiming the affair as evidence that his scans were correct. Rowe published a Brief Communication in Nature in 2001 describing his findings. He concluded that, apart from the top part, several specimens had been used to complete the fossil: a first for the left femur, a second for the tibiae, a third for both feet, and at least one more for the tail, which alone consisted of five separate parts.Rowe, T., Ketcham, R.A., Denison, C., Colbert, M., Xu, X., Currie, P.J. Nature vol. 410 29 March 2001 pp.539-540.

In June 2000 the fossil was returned to China. In the October 2000 issue, National Geographic published the results of their investigation.

Ongoing confusion
The fossils involved in the "Archaeoraptor" scandal have led to ongoing confusion over taxon names. In December 2000, Microraptor was described in Nature. Zhou et al. (2002) examined the upper body of the "Archaeoraptor" fossil and reported that it belonged to the previously-named genus Yanornis.

Dinosaur Museum Journal
In 2002 the Czerkases published a volume through their Dinosaur Museum titled Feathered Dinosaurs and the Origin of Flight. In this journal, they described and named several species. Of the six species named in the book, five are disputed.

Despite the work of Zhou et al. (2002), Czerkas and co-author Xu Xing described the upper portion of the "Archaeoraptor" fossil as a new bird genus, Archaeovolans, in the Dinosaur Museum Journal. The article does include the caveat that it might be a specimen of Yanornis. Thus, this same fossil specimen has been named "Archaeoraptor", Archeovolans, and Yanornis, in different places.

Across the monographs in the Dinosaur Museum Journal, Stephen Czerkas built a case for his controversial view that maniraptoran dinosaurs are secondarily flightless birds. In so doing, he criticized prominent paleontologists. In the text on Cryptovolans, Czerkas accused Dr. Mark Norell of misinterpreting the fossil BPM 1 3-13 as having long leg feathers due to the "blinding influences of preconceived ideas." Though Norell's interpretation was correct, Czerkas added leg feathers to his reconstruction of the fossil in the art that promotes the traveling exhibit.

Two other taxa that Czerkas and his co-authors named were later treated as junior synonyms by other authors. Czerkas' Cryptovolans was treated as Microraptor, and his Scansoriopteryx was treated as Epidendrosaurus.Padian, Kevin. (2001) "Basal Avialae" in "The Dinosauria" in The Dinosauria: Second Edition University of California Press. 2004. Czerkas described Omnivoropteryx, noting that it was similar to Sapeornis. Later specimens of Sapeornis with skulls demonstrated that the two were probably synonymous.

Another taxon that Czerkas assigned to the Pterosauria and named Utahdactylus was reviewed by Dr. Chris Bennett. Bennett found multiple misidentifications of bones and inconsistencies between Czerkas' diagrams and the actual fossils. Bennett found the specimen to be an indeterminate diapsid and criticized the previous authors for publishing a species name when no diagnostic characters below the class level could be verified. He made Utahdactylus a nomen dubium.

Traveling exhibit

In 2001 Stephen and Sylvia Czerkas compiled a traveling exhibit containing 34 other Chinese fossils. The show is titled Feathered Dinosaurs and the Origin of Flight. The San Diego Natural History Museum paid a set fee to the Dinosaur Museum to display this show in 2004. When the show opened, Dr. Ji Qiang told reporters from Nature that about a dozen of the fossils had left China illegally. Ji arranged with the Czerkases to assign accession numbers to three of the most valuable specimens, thus formally adding them to the collection of the Chinese Academy of Geological Sciences in Beijing, although they remain in the possession of the Czerkases. Stephen Czerkas denied Ji's assertion that the fossils were illegal. Sylvia Czerkas told the journal Nature that she had worked out an agreement with officials of Liaoning Province in 2001 to borrow the fossils and that they were to be repatriated in 2007. Through March 2009, however, the show was scheduled for the Fresno Metropolitan Museum of Art and Science in California. According to Nature, the Czerkases refused requests to make the officials from Liaoning available for an interview.

Many scientists consider it unethical to work on fossils if there is any chance that they have been smuggled, and many disregard privately owned fossils altogether. Some professionals feel that private collectors put fossils in private hands where science may not be able to access or study them. Some believe that private collectors may damage important fossils, subject them to forgery, and obscure their origins or evidence about their ages. Illegal dealers have also participated in and may encourage, governmental corruption. Another philosophy argues that if scientists could bend their ethics and agree to publish on important private fossils, this would encourage private holders to make them available for study.

The fossil most recently appeared in an exhibition in Wollaton Hall, near Nottingham, titled Dinosaurs of China: Ground Shakers to Feathered Flyers, where it was exhibited along with fossils of Yanoris and Microraptor, its main components.

Taxonomic history
In April 2000 Olson published an article in Backbone, the newsletter of the National Museum of Natural History. In this article, he justified his views on the evolution of birds, but also revised and redescribed the species "Archaeoraptor liaoningensis" by designating just the tail of the original fraudulent specimen as the type specimen. To prevent the tainted name "Archaeoraptor" from entering paleornithological literature, this redescription assigned the name to that part of the chimeric specimen least likely to be classified under Aves, rather than to the portion which was later shown to represent a true bird species. Olson presumed that the National Geographic article had already validly named the fossil, and he, therefore, failed to explicitly indicate the name was new, as demanded by article 16 of the ICZN as a condition for a name to be valid. Several months afterward Xu, Zhou, and Wang published their description of Microraptor zhaoianus in Nature.

Creationism

The scandal is sometimes used by creationists like Kent Hovind, Kirk Cameron, and Ray Comfort to cast doubt on the hypothesis that birds evolved from dinosaurs. Many creationists insist that no missing links between birds and dinosaurs have been found, and commonly point to "Archaeoraptor" as evidence of misconduct performed to support the evolutionary theory. They see "Archaeoraptor" as a "Piltdown Bird". However, contrary to the Piltdown Man, "Archaeoraptor" was not deliberately fabricated to support some evolutionary claim. Furthermore, the authenticity of "Archaeoraptor" would not have been essential proof for the hypothesis that birds are theropods, as this is sufficiently corroborated by other data; paleontologist Christopher Brochu concluded in November 2001: "That birds are derived from theropod dinosaurs is no longer the subject of scholarly dispute." Though playing the role of "terrestrial dinosaur" in the "Archaeoraptor" affair, the Microraptor, showing wings and clear traces of rectrices, is generally assumed to have had at least a gliding capacity and is itself an excellent example of a transitional fossil.

References

External links

 Helen Briggs, 'Piltdown' bird fake explained, from March 29, 2001, BBC News Online.
 Hillary Mayell, Dino Hoax Was Mainly Made of Ancient Bird, Study Says, from the November 20, 2002 National Geographic News.
 Simons, Lewis M., 2000. Archaeoraptor fossil trail. National Geographic 198(4) (October): 128–132.
 Reed, Christina. "Fossil Faux Pas" Geotimes'', March 2000.
 BBC Horizon 2002  "The dinosaur that fooled the world"

Feathered dinosaurs
Hoaxes in science
Invalid dinosaurs
Nomina nuda
Hoaxes in China
1999 in China
1999 hoaxes
Paleontological chimeras